Sheffield United Women Football Club is an English women's football club based in Sheffield, South Yorkshire.

History

In his role as Sheffield United's Community Officer, Tony Currie founded a female team called Sheffield Hallam United in 1993. When this team folded after five seasons, one of Currie's coaches Andy Keenan began hosting sessions for Year Five girls in Heeley. Despite only five players attending the first training session, they entered a local youth league in 1998–99 as Sheffield United Community Girls.

In 2002, an adult East Midlands Regional Women's Football League club called Sheffield Inter (formerly Inter Owls) were close to folding and Sheffield United Community Girls and Ladies successfully bid to take their place in 2002–03. Under new manager Derek Baxby the club finished 5th in its first season, 3rd in its second season and then finished as runners-up to Derby County in 2004–05. Inspired by 75-goal striker Jodie Michalska, the club secured promotion to the Midland Combination Women's Football League in 2005–06.

In July 2022 it was announced that all league and cup matches in the 2022/23 season would be played at Bramall Lane.

Players

Current squad
.

Former players

References

External links
Official site

2002 establishments in England
Association football clubs established in 2002
Women's football clubs in England
Football clubs in South Yorkshire
Sheffield & Hallamshire County FA members
Women's Championship (England) teams